Miha Zarabec (born 12 October 1991) is a Slovenian handball player who plays for THW Kiel and the Slovenian national team.

He competed at the 2016 European Men's Handball Championship.

References

External links

1991 births
Living people
Sportspeople from Novo Mesto
Slovenian male handball players
Olympic handball players of Slovenia
Handball players at the 2016 Summer Olympics
Expatriate handball players
Slovenian expatriate sportspeople in Germany
Handball-Bundesliga players
THW Kiel players
21st-century Slovenian people